Lim Jong-Wook (born 26 August 1986) is a South Korean footballer who plays as midfielder for Chungju Hummel FC in K League Challenge.

Career
He was selected by Chungju Hummel FC in 2013 K League Draft. He made his debut against Korean Police FC on 17 March 2013.

References

External links 

1986 births
Living people
Association football midfielders
South Korean footballers
South Korean expatriate footballers
Changwon City FC players
Chungju Hummel FC players
Korea National League players
K League 2 players
China League One players
Expatriate footballers in China
South Korean expatriate sportspeople in China
Kyung Hee University alumni